Dr. Vikas Mahatme (born 11 December 1957) is Padmashri Awarded Indian ophthalmologist, social entrepreneur, visionary and a former member of the Parliament in Rajya Sabha. Born in Amravati, he comes from Nagpur in the state of Maharashtra. He is well known across Maharashtra for his charitable and social works. He founded a charitable trust – S. Mahatme Eye Welfare Charitable Trust that runs Mahatme Eye Bank eye hospital in Nagpur as well as branches in Mumbai, Amravati, Gadchiroli and Pune. He received the Padma Shri for his charitable community work as an ophthalmologist. In June 2016, Mahatme was the Bharatiya Janata Party's candidate for the Rajya Sabha biennial elections, which he won unopposed. His candidature was strongly backed by Maharashtra Chief Minister Devendra Fadnavis and Union Minister Nitin Gadkari. He belongs to the Dhangar community. He has expressed support for implementing Scheduled Tribe reservation for Dhangar community in Maharashtra and is its first community member to get elected to parliament. He is currently a member of the Indian Nursing Council.

Early life and education 
Born in December 1957 in remote Wathoda Shukleswar village in Amravati, he underwent many struggles during his childhood, namely, lack of basic infrastructure like electricity. He used to go to a friends house to study under the light, as he didn't have electricity at his house. At the same time, he believes that they helped him to grow will and humility in his character. As a curious and energetic child, he attributes the instrumental role of his hobbies (like playing table tennis) to aid his reflexes and coordination during his career as an eye surgeon in the future. He recollects a childhood incident when he walked in a mango orchard and asked the gardener that who owns all the trees. The gardener replied that the tree belonged to the village community. He marks this conversation as a crucial life-lesson that imbibed the value of collective ethos in him. He moved to Nagpur while his father was serving in a central excise job where he continued his education until postgraduation in the Government Medical College situated there. After his MBBS and a masters in surgery in ophthalmology, he opened a clinic in the courtyard of his house on the outskirts of the Nagpur city. He has also been a lecturer in the Department of Ophthalmology in Government Medical College at Nagpur.

Professional career as an ophthalmologist

Personal achievements 
Dr. Mahatme has had a bright professional career as an eye surgeon. He earned an international stature, evident by him being invited to demonstrate his surgical skills in various countries like Malaysia, Indonesia, Romania, Russia, Egypt, Iraq and also various places in India. Apart from being an expert surgeon and practitioner, he possesses a sharp mind as an innovating researcher. He is credited for developing 'Woodcutter's Nucleus Cracking’, a modern technique for phacoemulsification. He also developed a pigment for Corneal Tattooing and Filtration Enhancing knot for glaucoma surgeries. Mahatme is an eye surgeon of international repute and has successfully performed over one lakh eye surgeries. He is the first ophthalmologist to demonstrate live surgery that was telecasted via-two way audio-video conferencing in 32 cities in India simultaneously. His contributions are widely accepted throughout the ophthalmologist community. He is associated with the National Programme of Control of Blindness (N.P.C.B.). He has been the President, Geriatric Society of India. He is an active Member of the American Academy of Ophthalmology (A.A.O.), All India Ophthalmological Society (A.I.O.S.), D.O.S., M.O.S., V.O.S., and N.A.O. He has worked with various international NGOs like Sight Saver, Help-Age India, Impact India, Empathy Foundation, Orbis International, RPG Foundation, SAAD Foundation, Volkart Foundation, Vision 2020. He is a member of the Indian Nursing Council (since Aug 2017). He was awarded the Col. Rangachari Award by the All India Ophthalmological Society for the best paper read at the special plenary session of annual conference in 1996.

Mahatme Eye Bank & Eye Hospital 
He is the founder and medical director of Mahatme Eye Bank & Eye Hospital, Nagpur which is a recognized postgraduate teaching institute run by S.M.M. Eye Welfare Charitable Trust. Till 2017, the hospital has performed over 1,80,000 eye operations out of which over 80,000 operations have been carried out free of cost. The hospital is recognized by the International Council of Ophthalmology (I.C.O.) - the apex international body of eye specialists - for surgical training and fellowship. The Government of India recognized the hospital as a surgical training institute, which has trained over 1500 ophthalmologists in India and across the globe through its surgical training programs on an International Level until 2017.

Social works

Public access to medical facilities 
Dr. Mahatme, an empathetic personality, is the first to start an eye bank in Vidarbha region of Maharashtra and established an eye donation movement there. He also runs several eye hospitals and vision centres in Central India including Nagpur, Amravati, Gadchiroli, and Mumbai. He is working for community outreach programmes in eye care since 1986. His team visits rural, tribal and slum areas and conducts eye screening camps. He pioneered setting up hospitals and mobile eye-units at several places including Nagpur, Mumbai, Amravati, Gadchiroli Melghat, Yavatmal, Gondia, Chandrapur, etc. He started Aankhwali Pum-Pum (a mobile eye unit) equipped with all gadgets for an eye check-up to cater to remote rural areas.

Health awareness campaigns 
He is energetic in spreading health awareness in the society through TV shows, newspaper articles, public forums and road shows. He has launched the 'Right to Health Movement' to make people aware about their health rights and about various government health schemes available to common man. He famously gave the slogan- ‘Health is my Womb-right.’ The trust organises  a free eye camp every year for lakhs of people coming to Deekshabhoomi, Nagpur on the occasion of Dhamma Chakra Pravarthan Din.

Social and emotional awareness initiatives 
He is a firm believer in the balance between physical, social, emotional and academic components of education. He came to an interesting narrative presentation titled “Happy Meaningful Life” and has been invited to several places in India and abroad to make this thought-provoking presentation. He started the 'Institute of Science of Happiness' which gives emphasis on developing thinking skills amongst young generation and empowering them with ten life skills underlined by the World Health Organisation. He also conducts regular programmes on personality development for N.C.C. and other students.

Upliftment of Dhangar community 
He is an eminent leader of the Dhangar community and continuously works on their problems in Maharashtra. To agitate for the demand of Scheduled Tribe reservation for Dhangars, he led a three-lakh strong march to Winter Assembly, Nagpur on 19 December 2013 and again on 8 December 2015 attended by around 4-5 lakh people. He further organized a huge convention of the community on 4 January 2015 and 5 November 2017, which were attended by the Devendra Fadnavis, Chief Minister of Maharashtra. His unique ability to bring Dhangars together contributed significantly in bringing over the change in the central as well as state government politics. He is also the Former President of a Maharashtra-based association called Dhangar Samaj Sangharsh Samiti, Maharashtra Rajya which aims for reservation for Dhangar community in government offices and educational institutions.

Others 
His other concerns include the shepherd community of Maharashtra that engages in sheep-rearing for their livelihood. He is currently pursuing the matter with the government about passes for sheep grazing confined sheep rearing etc. The Government of Maharashtra recognized his efforts by nominated him on the committee dealing with grazing problems of shepherds in Maharashtra. He went on to develop a model of totally confined sheep farm near Nagpur, inaugurated by Shri Nitin Gadkari, Hon'ble Minister of Road Transport and Highways.

Political career 
In July 2016, he contested Rajya Sabha biennial elections and emerged victorious unopposed. Since then, he has been actively involved in Parliamentary work by participating in various Parliamentary Committees. He has been a Member in Central Coordination Committee (July 2016 onwards), Committee on Science and Technology, Environment and Forests (July - Sept 2016), Currently he is member Committee on Health and Family Welfare (Sept 2016 onwards), Committee on Welfare of Other Backward Classes (OBCs) (Nov 2016 onwards), member Railway Consultative committee, Member Indian Nursing Council.

He also works for BJP's Vaidyakeey Aghadi / Deen Dayal Upadhyay Institute of Medical Science Research and Human Resources;

Awards and recognitions 
In 2010, he was awarded with Padma Shri by Hon'ble President of India for his contribution to ophthalmology and social work. He has also been recognized with Col. Rangachari National Award and gold medal for his contribution on ‘rectal mucous membrane graft for dry eye syndrome’.

Personal life 
He married Sunita in 1992, who is a Gynaecologist by profession. The couple has a son.

References

Scientists from Nagpur
1952 births
Living people
Bharatiya Janata Party politicians from Maharashtra
Rajya Sabha members from Maharashtra
Recipients of the Padma Shri in medicine
People from Amravati
Indian ophthalmologists
Medical doctors from Maharashtra
20th-century Indian medical doctors
20th-century surgeons